War of Ages is the first full-length album by Christian metal band War of Ages. It was released on the 2005 on Strike First Records, a branch of Facedown Records.

Track listing 
"Intro" - (0:14)
"Stand Your Ground" - (4:47)
"Brothers in Arms" - (3:58)
"False Prophet" - (4:31)
"Only the Strong Survive" - (3:37)
"My Solitude" - (3:27)
"Battle On" - (5:31)
"One Day" - (4:33)
"Scars of Tomorrow" - (3:18)
"Broken Before You" - (3:51)
"Second Chance" - (3:48)

Personnel

War of Ages 
 Leroy Hamp – lead vocals
 Steve Brown – lead guitar, backing vocals
 Kang Garnic - rhythm guitar
 Nate Owensby - bass
 Rob Kerner - drums

Production 
 Dave Quiggle - artwork

2005 debut albums
War of Ages albums